Soyuz TM-29 was a Russian Soyuz spaceflight launched from the Baikonur Cosmodrome aboard a Soyuz 11A511U rocket. It docked with Mir on February 22 at 05:36 GMT with cosmonauts Viktor Afanasyev of Russia, Jean-Pierre Haigneré of France, and Ivan Bella of Slovakia aboard. Since two crew seats had been sold (to Slovakia and France), Afanasyev was the only Russian cosmonaut aboard. This meant that Russian engineer Avdeyev already aboard Mir would have to accept a double-length assignment. After the February 27 departure of EO-26 crew commander Padalka and cosmonaut Bella aboard Soyuz TM-28, the new EO-27 Mir crew consisted of Afanasyev as Commander, Avdeyev as Engineer and French cosmonaut Haigneré.

Crew

Mission highlights
38th expedition to Mir.

References

Crewed Soyuz missions
Spacecraft launched in 1999